This is a list of compositions by the composer Thomas Adès sorted by genre, date of composition, title and scoring.

References

 
Adès, Thomas